Tammy Miller  (born 1959 or 1960) is an American accountant and politician from North Dakota. She is the 39th lieutenant governor of North Dakota, since 2023. Having been appointed by Governor Doug Burgum, following Lieutenant Governor Brent Sanford's resignation.

Early life and career
Miller is from Brocket, North Dakota, and attended high school in Lakota. She attended Minnesota State University Moorhead, earning a bachelor's degree in accounting and a Master of Business Administration. She is a certified public accountant.

Miller joined Border States, an electrical distributor based in Fargo, North Dakota, in 1991 as an accounting manager. She was promoted through the company before becoming the chief operating officer in 2006.

Political career
Miller considered running in the 2018 U.S. Senate election against Heidi Heitkamp, but opted not to run. She joined the office of the Governor of North Dakota in April 2020 as chief operating officer.

On December 20, 2022, Brent Sanford announced his resignation as lieuetnant governor of North Dakota, effective January 2, 2023. Governor Doug Burgum chose Miller to succeed Sanford. Miller is North Dakota’s third female lieutenant governor.

Personal life
Miller's husband, Craig Palmer, was the president of Multiband.

References

 

21st-century American businesspeople
21st-century American businesswomen
21st-century American women politicians
American accountants
American chief operating officers
Businesspeople from North Dakota
Living people
Minnesota State University Moorhead alumni
North Dakota Republicans
People from Ramsey County, North Dakota
Women accountants
Women in North Dakota politics
Year of birth missing (living people)